Steven Brosnan (born 9 October 1978) is a former Australian rules footballer who played with Port Adelaide in the Australian Football League (AFL).

A key position player, Brosnan played his early football with SANFL club Port Adelaide, before being recruited to the AFL by the Port Adelaide Football Club, with pick 57 in the 1999 AFL Draft. He played just one senior AFL game for the Power, in round three of the 2000 AFL season, against the Western Bulldogs at Docklands Stadium.

After being delisted, Brosnan played for various clubs, including Lucindale, Wonthaggi and Waikerie.

References

External links
 
 

1978 births
Australian rules footballers from South Australia
Port Adelaide Football Club players
Port Adelaide Football Club players (all competitions)
Port Adelaide Magpies players
Living people